The Aston Martin Vantage is a two-seater sports car built by British manufacturer Aston Martin since 2018. It replaces the previous model which had been in production for 12 years.

Models

Vantage V8 Coupe (2018-)
It was unveiled on 21 November 2017. Deliveries of the new Vantage began in June 2018.

Vantage AMR (2019-)
The Vantage AMR is a track-focused variant of the Vantage. The main highlight of the model is the replacement of the ZF 8-speed automatic transmission with a dog-leg Graziano Trasmissioni 7-speed manual transmission previously used on the V12 Vantage S. The AMR also comes with a driver-selectable AMSHIFT system which controls the throttle during gear shifting. A new limited-slip differential ensures linear delivery of power. The power-band of the engine is wider and the unit is designed to deliver  of torque from 2,000 rpm to 5,000 rpm. New adaptive dampers with the section of Sport, Sport + and Track modes improve handling. Performance figures include a 0– acceleration time of 3.9 seconds, half a second more than the standard Vantage while the top speed remains the same as the standard model. Visual changes include 20-inch forged wheels as available on the Rapide AMR, new carbon fibre side vents and cooling vents present on the hood a sports exhaust system with quad tailpipes and racing bucket seats. Production of the AMR will be limited to 200 units worldwide. Available exterior colours for the AMR include Sabiro Blue, Pnyx Black, China Grey and White Stone. The final 59 cars will be finished in a Sterling Green exterior colour with Lime accents and will pay homage to the 1959 24 Hours of LeMans victory of Aston Martin. Once the production of the AMR ceases, the 7-speed manual transmission will become available on the standard Vantage.

The vehicle went on sale in 2019-05-01, with delivery set to begin in Q4 2019.

Vantage Roadster (2020-)

Revealed in February 2020, it is a convertible version of V8 Coupe with a fabric roof.

Delivery was set to begin in Q4 2019.

Vantage 007 Edition (2021-)
It is a version of V8 Coupe commemorating the No Time to Die movie. Inspired by the Aston Martin V8 Vantage from the 1987 James Bond film The Living Daylights, the Vantage 007 Edition comes equipped with a unique mesh grille and chrome bezel, as well as Cumberland Grey exterior paint over an obsidian black leather interior. Production is limited to 100 units.

Delivery began in Q1 2021.

V12 Speedster

In March 2020, Aston Martin introduced the V12 Speedster, a production car inspired by the DBR1 of the late 1950's and the 2013 CC100 concept. Aston Martin will produce 88 units at a base price of $950,000. It uses a 5.2-litre twin turbo V12 based on the one from the DBS Superleggera but with less power and torque. The engine sends its power to a ZF 8-speed gearbox. It does the 0 to 62 mph in 3.5 seconds and has a top speed of 186 mph. It has 21-inch forged, center-locking wheels, carbon ceramic brakes and adaptive dampers. It uses a version of the Vantage roadster's bonded aluminium chassis, along with most of the front-end structure of the DBS Superleggera grafted on to accommodate the larger size of its V12. It has pods behind the seats that are sized to transport helmets and a removeable leather bag where the glovebox would normally be.

Safety Car

Vantage became the official Safety Car of Formula One, alongside the Mercedes-AMG GT R Safety Car in early 2021. The Vantage Safety Car has a British Racing Green livery with neon yellow accents, and it has been modified to fit with Safety Car standards. The car made its debut as the Safety Car at the 2021 Bahrain Grand Prix. In 2021 it was based on the normal V8 Vantage but in 2022 its based on the Vantage F1 Edition

Vantage F1 Edition (2021-)

It is a version of V8 Coupe and V8 Roadster commemorating Aston Martin's return to Formula One after 61 years. The car is available in three colours: Aston Martin Racing Green, Jet Black, and Lunar White. A convertible version called the Roadster is also available.

Delivery began in May 2021.

V12 Vantage (2022-)
In December 2021, Aston Martin confirmed that a V12 Vantage is in development and is slated to be released in 2022. The V12 Vantage was officially unveiled in 16 March 2022, and its production is limited to just 333 units. It marks the last Aston Martin vehicle to use V12 engine.

Delivery began in Q2 2022.

V12 Vantage Roadster (2022-)

Aston Martin revealed at 2022 Pebble Beach Concours d'Elégance a convertible version of the V12 Vantage. It develops  and will be only produced at 249 units, all sold out.

Design 

The design of the new Vantage is inspired by the track-only Vulcan and the purpose made DB10 that appeared in the James Bond film Spectre. The front grille, specifically inspired by the Vulcan, helps in efficient engine cooling.

The Vantage's interior configuration also differs from the DB11 in various ways apart from seating capacity, such as the centre console design. Whereas the DB11's centre stack controls are quite intuitive and more spatial in terms of button/switch arrangement, the Vantage's appears more cluttered and lacks an optical disc drive, as well as separate temperature displays for the automatic climate control. For purpose of weight saving, the Vantage also forfeits the passenger glove compartment and maintains a simple centre console design (as opposed to the DB11's deluxe power-sliding variant).

Motorsport

GTE

The Vantage GTE is the GTE-class racing version of the Vantage made to compete in the FIA World Endurance Championship. Like the road-going car, the GTE uses the Mercedes-AMG V8 engine, though it is paired with a 6-speed Xtrac sequential gearbox. Additional changes are made to the engine to increase power. The car is convertible to GT3 specification.

DTM

HWA AG, in partnership with Aston Martin and R-Motorsport, made an all-new car for the 2019 Deutsche Tourenwagen Masters, based on the new Vantage. The Vantage competed in place of Mercedes-Benz's entry after the manufacturer left the competition to focus on Formula E.

GT3

The Vantage GT3 is the successor of the V12 Vantage GT3. It features a quick-shifting Xtrac 6-speed sequential gearbox, an Alcon motorsport multi-plate clutch, Öhlins four-way adjustable dampers, Alcon brakes, and a Bosch anti-lock braking system.

GT4

The Vantage GT4 is the replacement of the previous generation GT4, and is intended for entry-level drivers in competitive motorsports. The Vantage GT4 made its debut in the 2019 24 Hours Nürburgring.

Specifications and performance

The Vantage uses powertrain and infotainment technology from Mercedes-Benz, like the DB11. The Vantage uses a rear-mounted 8-speed automatic gearbox manufactured by ZF Friedrichshafen, and will be the only vehicle that pairs the Mercedes-AMG V8 with a manual transmission when the combination is made available. The engine is positioned as far back with the chassis as possible, and a 50/50 front/rear weight distribution has been achieved with the car. The Vantage is also the first Aston Martin production car to feature an electronically controlled differential with torque vectoring, and is built around the same all-new bonded-aluminium platform as the DB11, although around 70% of its components are said to be unique to the Vantage.

References

External links

Aston Martin page: V8 Coupe, V8 Roadster, F1 Edition, V12 Vantage
Press kit: Vantage

Vantage (2018)
Cars introduced in 2018
Sports cars
Front mid-engine, rear-wheel-drive vehicles